Duathlon is an athletic event that consists of a running leg, followed by a cycling leg and then another running leg in a format similar to triathlons. The International Triathlon Union governs the sport internationally.

Distance and format
Duathlons are conducted at sprint, standard, middle and long distances. The following distances are considered typical for the sport; however, individual races may vary. 
Sprint distance - 5 km run, 20 km bike, 2.5 km run
Standard distance - 10 km run, 40 km bike, 5 km run
Middle distance - 10 km run, 60 km bike, 10 km run
Long distance - 10 km run, 150 km bike, 30 km run

Off-road duathlon
Off-road duathlon is a form of duathlon, where the competitors have to go through a trail-running stage and a mountain-biking stage, finishing with a final running stage. Off-road duathlons are distinguished from conventional duathlons in that the terrain for the cycling and running stages are generally unpaved, rough, and very steep and hilly. They require different techniques than conventional duathlon races, and the athletes employ mountain bikes rather than road bikes.

Relationships to similar sports
Duathlons are most similar to triathlons, with the key difference being the replacement of the swimming leg with a second run. Other sports derived from triathlon include aquathlon, which combines swimming and running but has omitted the cycling part, and aquabike, with the swim and bike and no run.

The word duathlon is also used for some events which comprise running or walking and cycling, but not in three stages, such as the annual Highland Cross in Scotland. The word duathlon does not appear in the online Oxford English Dictionary , nor in the 11th edition (2008) of Chambers Dictionary, but a definition available online from Collins English Dictionary defines it as "an athletic contest in which each athlete competes in running and cycling events" without specifying the three-stage structure of the International Triathlon Union's definition.

Team duathlon

In this variation, the cycling and running segments need to be undertaken simultaneously by a team consisting of a predetermined number of individuals. Only one of the team members is running while all others are cycling. All the members of a team must be together at any given point of time but exchanging the tasks of running and cycling amongst the team members themselves is permitted.

The challenge is to rotate the task of running at an optimum rate such that the time from start to destination is minimized. This demands a smooth coordination amongst all team members which makes the sport more exciting. An example is the 100 km-Duathlon around Dresden which is the oldest of its kind in Germany.

Notable duathlons 
World Triathlon organizes the World Triathlon Duathlon Championships on a yearly basis since 1990. Since 2017, it has been part of the World Triathlon Multisport World Championships although it was run as a separate event again in 2021, as the Multisport World Championships got cancelled

Powerman Duathlon is the major run bike run brand in the world.

The Powerman Duathlon World Series  is the major international duathlon series with 10-20 middle to long distance races across the globe each year. The series incorporates National, Continental and World Championships as well as numerous series races awarding points to crown an overall series winner at the end of the season after the world championships in September.

The world's largest duathlon to date is the inaugural London Duathlon, which took place on 17 September 2005 in Richmond Park, Surrey. Approximately 2,500 people took part. The main race consisted of a 10 km run, 20 km cycle ride and 5 km run. Since 2005 London Duathlon has grown to just under 4,000 participants, 2010 saw the first running of the Ultra Distance at London which will consist of 20 km run, 77 km bike and 10 km run. Now in its 9th year, London Duathlon will be taking place on Sunday 14 September 2014 offering athletes of all abilities the chance to race through the stunning surroundings of Richmond Park while on closed roads. "Classic" distance consists of a 10 km run, 44 km cycle ride and 5 km run.

The World's premier duathlon is Powerman Zofingen, in Switzerland. It is a hilly 10 km run, mostly on trails, followed by a very hilly 150 km road bike consisting of three 50 km loops each of which feature the Bodenburg ascent (scene of Kenny Souza's DNF in a snow storm when he raced in a neon Speedo and small tank top), and finally a very hilly 30 km two loop trail run.

The longest continually running duathlon series is still organized by the NY Triathlon Club in and around New York City, USA.

With the popularity of extreme sports, a new form of duathlon has become popular in the last few years.  Referred to as an off-road duathlon, or "Dirty-Du", it consists of an off-road or trail run, followed by a mountain bike leg followed by a final off-road or trail run. The Dirty Du off-road duathlon series, held in Texas, was made famous by Lance Armstrong, who won it in 2003.

Notable duathletes

Men
Kenny Souza – 1990 ITU world champion
Benny Vansteelant – winner of the World Duathlon, World Long-Distance Duathlon, European Duathlon and numerous Powerman titles.
Joerie Vansteelant – winner of the World Long-Distance Duathlon 2007
Koen Maris – 2007 Powerman Duathlon World Champion (10 km/150 km/30 km)
Rob Woestenborghs – 2008 World Champion Duathlon Short Distance in Rimini
Bart Aernouts – 2010 World Champion Duathlon Short Distance in Edinburgh
Emilio Martin – 2012 World Champion Duathlon Short Distance in Nancy 
Gael Le Bellec – 2014, 2015 and 2018 ITU LD World Champion

Women
Catriona Morrison – 2006 and 2010 World Duathlon Champion, 2007 and 2008 World Long-Distance Duathlon Champion, 2007 and 2009 European Duathlon Champion 
Emma Pooley – 2014, 2015, 2016, 2017 ITU LD World Champion, 2017 European MD Champion

References

External links

London Duathlon
NI Duathlon (Northern Ireland)
Duathlon.ca
Duathlon.com

 
Multisports
Cycle racing by discipline